Syndicate Block may refer to:

Syndicate Block (Des Moines, Iowa), listed on the National Register of Historic Places in Polk County, Iowa
Syndicate Block (La Porte City, Iowa), listed on the National Register of Historic Places in Black Hawk County, Iowa